Caleb Robinson Ayer (May 22, 1813 – October 5, 1883) was an American politician from Maine. Ayer graduated from Dartmouth College in 1834 and was admitted to the bar in 1838. He was an associate of Nathan Clifford and moved to Cornish in York County in 1841. Six years later in 1847, Ayer was elected as a Democrat to the Maine State Senate and served as Senate President in 1848. In 1856, he served as the Secretary of State of Maine under Governor Samuel Wells. He served as the York County Attorney General from 1868 to 1870. He died in 1883. The Caleb R. Ayer House in Cornish is listed on the National Register of Historic Places.

References

1813 births
1883 deaths
Maine lawyers
People from Cornish, Maine
Presidents of the Maine Senate
Democratic Party Maine state senators
Secretaries of State of Maine
Dartmouth College alumni
19th-century American politicians
19th-century American lawyers